Jurica Puljiz (born 13 December 1979) is a Croatian retired football defender who last played for NK Jadran Luka Ploče.

Career
Born in Imotski, Puljiz started to play for Hajduk Split at the age of ten and stayed in the club until 2002, when he went on to play one season for HNK Šibenik before signing with Eintracht Frankfurt in the summer of 2003. He played in 15 Bundesliga matches and scored one goal for Eintracht. Puljiz was about to sign a long-term contract with Eintracht but got severely injured, keeping him out of the game for almost two years.

He also played for NK Široki Brijeg, defending champions of Bosnia and Herzegovina, until December 2006. In January 2009, he left for HŠK Zrinjski Mostar. In August 2010, he signed a contract with that time Latvian champions FK Liepājas Metalurgs. He played 15 matches in the LMT Virsliga, scoring two goals. He also played two matches in the Champions League qualification in 2010, when Metalurgs were both times beaten by the Czech giants Sparta Praha. He was released by Liepāja after the season ended.

References

External links
 

1979 births
Living people
Sportspeople from Imotski
Association football defenders
Croatian footballers
Croatia youth international footballers
HNK Hajduk Split players
HNK Šibenik players
Eintracht Frankfurt players
NK Široki Brijeg players
SC Rheindorf Altach players
FC Zorya Luhansk players
HŠK Zrinjski Mostar players
Flamurtari Vlorë players
FC Taraz players
FK Liepājas Metalurgs players
Croatian Football League players
Bundesliga players
Premier League of Bosnia and Herzegovina players
Austrian Football Bundesliga players
Ukrainian Premier League players
Kategoria Superiore players
Latvian Higher League players
Croatian expatriate footballers
Expatriate footballers in Germany
Croatian expatriate sportspeople in Germany
Expatriate footballers in Bosnia and Herzegovina
Croatian expatriate sportspeople in Bosnia and Herzegovina
Expatriate footballers in Austria
Croatian expatriate sportspeople in Austria
Expatriate footballers in Ukraine
Croatian expatriate sportspeople in Ukraine
Expatriate footballers in Albania
Croatian expatriate sportspeople in Albania
Expatriate footballers in Kazakhstan
Croatian expatriate sportspeople in Kazakhstan
Expatriate footballers in Latvia
Croatian expatriate sportspeople in Latvia